The Fundación Cultural Patagonia String Quartet (FCP String Quartet) is a musical group from Patagonia.

Three of its members are natives of the nation of Georgia, in the Caucasus. The group plays classical music, contemporary, tango, folklore and Georgian music.

History

The Quartet was founded in 1998 under the guidance of Ljerko Spiller at a time when the former members of the USSR were faced with major economic and political problems.

Elvira Faseeva Tbilisi, Vitali Bujiashvili and Gela Gelashvil from Msjeta (old capital of Georgia), in search of a living for his family, accepted an invitation to travel to Argentina and a contract for a year to assemble a string quartet at the Arts University of General Roca city  (Rio Negro province, Patagonia).
Later, Juan Bautista Constanza of Santa Fe became the fourth member of the quartet.

The Quartet´s first concert took place on September 12 at  “Ciudad de las Artes” Auditorium, General Roca, Río Negro.

Other activities
Members of the group regularly teach regularly at IUPA (Instituto Universitario Patagonico de Artes) in Gral. Roca, Rio Negro, Argentina.

From 2008 to 2013 they collaborated with painter Georg and musician Xunorus in Cantata Romanos VIII, a CD with instrumental music from Patagonia.

Members
Elvira Faseeva (violin) 1998-
Vitali Vilishvili (violin) 1998-
Gela Gelashvili (viola) 1998-
Juan Costanza (cello) 1999-

References

External links

IUPA Website

Argentine musicians
Contemporary classical music ensembles
Musical groups established in 1998
Quartets